Michee Ngalina (born 6 April 2000) is a Congolese footballer who plays as a forward for Göztepe in the TFF First League.

Career 
Ngalina spent time with the Florida-based Montverde Academy before going on trial at United Soccer League side Bethlehem Steel. He joined the club permanently on 27 April 2018.

On 8 May 2019, Ngalina signed for MLS side Philadelphia Union.

Ngalina was released by Philadelphia following their 2020 season. On 25 December 2020, it was announced that Ngalina would join USL Championship side Colorado Springs Switchbacks ahead of their 2021 season.

On 21 September 2021, Ngalina was loaned to Major League Soccer side Los Angeles FC for the remainder of the 2021 season.

On 9 November 2022, Ngalina was named the 2022 USL Championship Young Player of the Year.

On 2 January 2023, it was announced that Ngalina had signed with Turkish TFF First League side Göztepe on a two-and-a-half year deal.

Honors

Individual
USL Championship Young Player of the year: 2022

References

External links 
 

2000 births
Living people
Democratic Republic of the Congo footballers
Democratic Republic of the Congo expatriate footballers
Expatriate soccer players in the United States
Philadelphia Union II players
Philadelphia Union players
Colorado Springs Switchbacks FC players
Los Angeles FC players
Association football forwards
USL Championship players
Major League Soccer players
Democratic Republic of the Congo expatriate sportspeople in the United States
Footballers from Kinshasa
Democratic Republic of the Congo youth international footballers
Expatriate footballers in Turkey
Democratic Republic of the Congo expatriate sportspeople in Turkey